This is a list of notable or recurring items from the BBC television series Doctor Who.

C

Celery
The Fifth Doctor wears a sprig of celery in his lapel. He claims that he is allergic to certain gases in the praxis range; if those gases were present, the sprig would turn purple, at which point he would eat it. Peter Davison asked for this explanation to be included in The Caves of Androzani, as it was his final story. It is referred to later in the same story by the Doctor as "a powerful restorative where I come from..."  The Doctor acquires the celery in Castrovalva and replaces it in Enlightenment.

A piece of plastic celery from the series fetched £5,500 for charity when sold at an auction in November 2007.

Chameleon circuit

The Chameleon Circuit is a component of the TARDIS that allows it to change shape to match its surroundings and remain inconspicuous. The circuit has malfunctioned, leaving it stuck in the shape of a 1960s style British police box. Attempts to repair the circuit have led to unpredictable results, including the TARDIS taking on the form of a pipe-organ. Since then, the Doctor has said that he has become fond of the police box form and has stopped trying to repair it. The TARDISes owned by the Master, the Rani, and the Monk have fully functioning chameleon circuits. In series one episode "Boom Town", the Ninth Doctor explains to Captain Jack Harkness and Mickey Smith about the chameleon circuit and why the TARDIS has been "permanently" imaged as a police box. In the episode "Journey's End", when Donna Noble has the Doctor's knowledge in her head due to an instantaneous biological meta crisis, she starts to tell the Tenth Doctor how he can fix the chameleon circuit before the knowledge in her head overwhelms her. The Eleventh Doctor explains to Amy Pond (set between "The Eleventh Hour" and "The Beast Below" in a deleted scene featured on the Series 5 boxset special Meanwhile in the TARDIS) that the TARDIS takes a 12-dimensional scan of the surrounding area and determines what the best thing to turn itself into is. Even though the circuit is broken, the TARDIS can still turn invisible, as shown in The Invasion and "The Impossible Astronaut", the former due to a Cyberman attack that causes the visual stabilizer to malfunction. In the comic, "Hunters of the Burning Stone", it is revealed the circuit is intentionally broken in the First Doctor's TARDIS by the Eleventh as part of a plan to stop the Tribe of Gum.

E

Eye of Harmony

The Eye of Harmony is an artificially created black hole made by Omega, used by the Time Lords as a power source for time travel. The 1996 film Doctor Who, and the episode "Journey to the Centre of the TARDIS", suggests that there is more than one Eye of Harmony, or that the Doctor needs to get one of his own after the Cardiff Rift sealed itself and no more energy could be siphoned off of its scar.

H

Hand of Omega

The Hand of Omega is a device that can collapse a star into a black hole. Omega supposedly used this device to harness the energy and negative continuum inside it to enable time travel. It can also be used to destroy entire star systems by taking out the magnetic fields surrounding atoms. The counteraction of this device occurs in the seventh doctors' story, Remembrance of the Daleks.

J

A Journal of Impossible Things
A dream diary, containing notes and sketches by the Tenth Doctor's human persona, John Smith, in "Human Nature" and "The Family of Blood". The title is handwritten on the journal's first page. Referred to by Smith as "stories", it is shown on screen as scribbled words and what appear to be ink sketches, recording what Smith remembers from dreams about his adventures as the Doctor. Joan Redfern retains the Journal at the end of "The Family of Blood", and it is eventually published in 2009 by her granddaughter in "The End of Time".

One two-page spread contains illustrations of all ten Doctors to date, as seen on a flash animation on the BBC web site at the time of "The Family of Blood" air date. The drawings seen on screen in "Human Nature" are of the First, Fifth, Sixth, Seventh, and Eighth Doctors, the first time each has been depicted in the revived series. The journal also features sketches of the TARDIS interior and exterior, a sonic screwdriver, the Torchwood Institute logo, K-9, Rose Tyler, Autons, clockwork androids, Cybermen, Daleks, the Moxx of Balhoon, gas-masked people from "The Empty Child"/"The Doctor Dances", and the Slitheen.

The text includes repeated phrases describing key concepts (such as "magic box", referring to the TARDIS), along with many misspellings. One repeated phrase, "bigger inside than outside", also appears in Latin as: Maius Intra Qua Extra. The Journal prop was created by artist Kellyanne Walker and incorporates text provided by writer Paul Cornell.

K

Key to Time

The most powerful artifact in the universe that is capable of anything the user can imagine. It can restore balance to the universe, or cause utter chaos. Both the Black and White Guardians seek it, but the Doctor prevents the former from gaining control of it by scattering it across time and space.

M

Matrix

P

Psychic paper
Psychic paper is a blank, white visitor's card that has special properties. When shown to a person, it can usually induce them to see whatever the user expects, wishes, or needs them to see printed on it. In "Revolution of the Daleks," the Thirteenth Doctor gifts two pieces of psychic paper to companions Ryan Sinclair and Graham O'Brien upon their departure from the TARDIS.

S

Severed hand

The Tenth Doctor's severed right hand is kept in a transparent case filled with a preservative liquid. It is severed by a Sycorax sword during their invasion of Earth ("The Christmas Invasion"). The Doctor regrew the hand due to the healing after-effects of his recent regeneration. Captain Jack Harkness retrieved the hand and stored it at the Torchwood Hub.

In the Torchwood episode "End of Days", the hand glows when the TARDIS is heard materialising in Cardiff. Alerted by the hand, Jack finds the Doctor in "Utopia", and he describes the hand as a "Doctor detector"; at the end of the episode, the hand is stolen by the Master along with the Doctor's TARDIS. In "The Sound of Drums", the Master reveals he has used the hand to derive the Doctor's biological code, with which he accelerates the Doctor's ageing by one hundred years using his laser screwdriver. After the events of "Last of the Time Lords", the Doctor recovers the hand.

It is later seen at the end of the episode, "The Poison Sky", where it glows as it did in "End of Days". In "The Doctor's Daughter", this instance of glowing is explained as sensing the appearance of the Doctor's genetic material, in the form of Jenny, in another time period.

At the end of the episode "The Stolen Earth", the Doctor is shot by a Dalek and is forced to regenerate, but in the following episode, "Journey's End", the Doctor transfers the regeneration energy into the hand, allowing him to heal his wounds but still keep the same form. Donna later touches the hand while it is still infused with regeneration energy, causing the hand to regenerate into a half-human, half-Time Lord copy of the Doctor, with the side effect of giving Donna the knowledge of a Time Lord.

Sonic blaster (squareness gun)

Featured in "The Doctor Dances", the sonic blaster, also known as a "squareness gun", is a handheld weapon from the 51st century. The one featured is owned by Captain Jack Harkness. It fires in a peculiar square shape rather than the more traditional round pattern of most science fiction weapons. In "Silence in the Library", set in the 51st century, Professor River Song possesses a weapon which acts in exactly the same manner, and Steven Moffat, author of both stories, says it is the same item, left in the TARDIS by Jack and taken by River during her time with the Doctor, a time which is actually in the future of the Doctor's personal timeline.

In "Revolution of the Daleks," Jack is armed with a sonic blaster while helping the Thirteenth Doctor and her companions investigate a Dalek threat on Earth. Yasmin Khan is unimpressed with his use of it to open a hole in a door, but Jack is later able to kill two attacking Dalek mutants with the gun.

Sonic screwdriver

Superphone
The "superphone" is an upgraded mobile phone that can make calls across time and space. It even calibrates to the user's home time period, as shown by Adam Mitchell's ability to call his home time on Rose Tyler's phone ("The Long Game"), despite their native time periods being about six years apart. In addition, it can send signals in places ordinary phones cannot, such as the sealed Cabinet Rooms at 10 Downing Street ("World War Three"). However, its range is not infinite ("The Impossible Planet"). The Doctor describes the superphone as being able to "call anyone, in any time, so long as you know the area code".

The superphone first appears in "The End of the World", where the Ninth Doctor modifies Rose's Nokia 3200 mobile phone with a special device that goes in place of the battery. In "Rise of the Cybermen", the Nokia 3200 is replaced by a Samsung D500, but otherwise seems to function the same. A Samsung D500 is also seen used by Tish Jones in "The Sound of Drums". It is also able to link with the Cybus Industries Ear-Pod network. Rose gives the phone to Mickey Smith at the end of "The Age of Steel", but replaces it soon after.

When Martha Jones becomes an ongoing companion to the Tenth Doctor in "42", he gives her phone, the BenQ-Siemens EF81, a similar upgrade. This phone, however, is upgraded by the Doctor's sonic screwdriver, and the feature itself is referred to as "Universal Roaming". Martha's phone has the Archangel network logo on its display, the significance of which is revealed in "The Sound of Drums". At the end of the episode "Last of the Time Lords", Martha gives her phone to the Doctor, so she can contact him if trouble occurs.

The Doctor uses the same process to upgrade Donna Noble's phone in "The Doctor's Daughter", but it is only used once onscreen to contact Martha's similarly upgraded phone. When his allies try contact the Doctor in "The Stolen Earth" by means of Martha's superphone now in his possession, the number displayed onscreen is 07700 900461. After the airing of this episode, 2,500 fans tried to dial the number. In "Journey's End", Wilfred mentions that he has received a phone call from Donna, presumably by means of her superphone.

There are at least two superphones available for use in the Eleventh Doctor's TARDIS; Amy Pond's phone and a flip phone sometimes used by the Doctor. Special Agent Delaware used Amy Pond's cell phone to receive a call from the Doctor's flip phone in 1969, before cell networks existed, indicating that both phones must have been upgraded by the Doctor at some point ("Day of the Moon"). In "The Doctor's Wife", the Doctor uses Amy's phone to keep in touch with Amy and Rory, who are trapped inside the TARDIS. Rory is shown to have one in "Dinosaurs on a Spaceship", with his father questioning the oddity of it; Rory commented, "You get used to it."

T

TARDIS

A TARDIS (Time And Relative Dimension In Space) is a spaceship invented by the Time Lords that can travel through space and time. The Doctor travels in a Type 40 TARDIS. A TARDIS can travel to any time and place in the universe, except to events that are Time-Locked, such as the Time War. The TARDIS is bigger on the inside than the outside, and its main fuel is Artron energy, a positive time synergy that can almost penetrate time gates. In "The Impossible Planet" it is stated that TARDISes are grown, rather than built, and that no other TARDIS could be created, as the last seeds for them were destroyed in the Time War.

Time scoop
The Time Scoop was a primitive 'Time Corridor' technology created on Gallifrey during the Dark Time, similar in sophistication to Dalek time-travel technology. Its purpose was to remotely 'scoop' individuals from their own time period and deposited them within the Death Zone, a securely controlled environment on Gallifrey. Those kidnapped were then expected to compete in gladiatorial games. In "The Five Doctors", the Scoop was used to fetch various incarnations of the Doctor and his companions to the Death Zone, along with various foes such as the Daleks, Cybermen, and Yeti. The Time Scoop plays a minor role in the Eighth Doctor Adventures novel The Eight Doctors, and a major role in the final chapter of the Gallifrey audio series.

V

Vortex manipulator

A vortex manipulator is a simple form of time travel used by Time Agents in the future. It is a small device mounted in a leather wrist strap that allows the user to travel through time and space. It is stated to be a much more primitive form of time travel than a TARDIS, and has been said to be unpleasant to use. It is also capable of teleporting the user without travelling through time. The most notable user of a vortex manipulator is Captain Jack Harkness, who possessed one from his time as a Time Agent. After being abandoned in the year 200,100 by the Doctor, he attempted to use his manipulator to travel to 21st century Earth to find him, but the device malfunctioned and took him to the 19th century, where it subsequently burnt out and was rendered non-functional (at least the time travel and teleport function, other functions were shown to be working). After the Master stole the Doctor's TARDIS, the Doctor repaired Jack's manipulator and used it to transport him, Jack, and Martha Jones from the end of the universe to 21st century Earth, although he subsequently deactivated the device to prevent Jack from misusing it. Jack later managed to reactivate it again to meet up with the Doctor, but once again it was later deactivated.

Other notable users of vortex manipulators include River Song, Clara Oswald (who used Jack's manipulator), Missy, and the Doctor.

See also
 List of Torchwood items
 List of The Sarah Jane Adventures items

Notes

References

 Mark Harris,  The Doctor Who Technical Manual J.M. Dent 
 John Nathan-Turner The TARDIS Inside Out Piccadilly 
 Mat Irvine, (Dr Who) Special Effects Beaver 
 Peter Haining, The Time-Travellers' Guide WH Allen 
 Jean-Marc Lofficier, The Programme Guide Target 
 Encyclopedia of the Worlds of Doctor Who: A-D by David Saunders Pub by Piccadilly 
 Encyclopedia of the Worlds of Doctor Who: E-K by David Saunders Pub by Piccadilly 
 Encyclopedia of the Worlds of Doctor Who: L-R by David Saunders Pub by Piccadilly 
 Doctor Who: A Celebration by Peter Haining Pub by Virgin 
 Doctor Who From A to Z by Gary Gillatt Pub by BBC Books 

Doctor Who devices
Items